Kuya'mu was a Native American village of the Chumash people located on the Gaviota Coast in the modern-day county of Santa Barbara, California in the United States.

In 1602, the Viscaino expedition stopped by the Goleta Valley and the nearby Chumash village of Mikiw, known today as Dos Pueblos . The village was situated on the Pacific coast, at the site of the current Dos Pueblos in the city of Goleta, California. To its west, across the Dos Pueblos Creek, was the adjacent coastal village of Mikiw.

In August 1769, the Spanish missionary and explorer Juan Crespí recorded that Mikiw and Kiya'mu were "very large villages with vast numbers of people and a great many houses in each, where they have their towns at the very edge of the sea."

References

Former Native American populated places in California
Former populated places in California
Native American populated places
Chumash populated places